Christoph Friedrich Reinhold Lisiewski (or Lisiewsky) (3 June 1725 in Berlin – 11 June 1794 in Ludwigslust) was an 18th-century German portrait painter.

Lisiewski belonged to a family of painters, founded by his father, Georg Lisiewski, a native of Poland who was an active portrait painter in Berlin. Christoph Lisiewski was from 1752 to 1772 court painter to the Prince of Anhalt-Dessau. In that time, he also traveled to Dresden and Leipzig to work. He then brought together with his sister Anna Dorothea Therbusch a workshop in Berlin in which a shared work was performed, activities lasted from 1773 to 1779. His other sister was the portrait painter Anna Rosina de Gasc. In 1783 he became an honorary member of the Prussian Academy of Arts in Berlin.

As the successor to his nephew Georg David Matthieu, he was a portrait painter for the Mecklenburg-Schwerin court at Ludwigslust palace. He worked there for 18 years - until his death. His daughter is the artist Friederike Julie Lisiewski.

References
 
 Christoph Friedrich Reinhold Lisiewski. In: Ulrich Thieme, Felix Becker, among others: General lexicon of visual artists from antiquity to the present, Vol. 23, E.A. Seemann, Leipzig 1929, pp. 283–284.
 Helmut Börsch-Supan: Lisiewski, Christian Friedrich Reinhold. In: New German Biography (NDB). Vol. 14, Duncker & Humblot, Berlin 1985, p. 684 (digitized).
 Thomas Weiss (ed.): Christoph Friedrich Reinhold Lisiewsky (1725-1794), German art publishing house, Berlin 2010, .
 Wolfgang Savelsberg: Christoph Friedrich Reinhold Lisiewsky. Design of a real image of man. In: Human Images in the 18th century. Search for clues in museums and archives of Saxony-Anhalt, Hall: Medium German Verlag 2011, pp. 89–102

18th-century German painters
18th-century German male artists
German male painters
1725 births
1794 deaths
German portrait painters
Court painters